Ocellularia wolseleyana is a species of lichen in the family Graphidaceae. Found in Eastern Thailand, it was formally described as a new species in 2002 by lichenologists Natsurang Homchantara and Brian J. Coppins. Here, in a mixed deciduous forest, the lichen was found growing on rock and on bark. It has a smooth and shiny, irregularly cracked thallus that ranges in colour from whitish mineral grey to olivaceous grey. It has a dense cortex and a white to creamy buff medulla. It contains psoromic acid, a secondary compound. Ocellularia neomasonhalei is similar in appearance to O. wolseleyana.

References

wolseleyana
Lichen species
Lichens described in 2002
Lichens of Thailand
Taxa named by Brian John Coppins
Taxa named by Natsurang Homchantara